Veslfjelltinden is a mountain in Lom Municipality in Innlandet county, Norway. The mountain is surrounded by several other notable mountains including Loftet to the northeast; Galdhøpiggen, Skagsnebb, and Sauhøi to the east; Storbreahøe to the southeast; and Veslbreatinden and Storbreatinden to the south.

See also
List of mountains of Norway by height

References

Jotunheimen
Lom, Norway
Mountains of Innlandet